William W. Stow was an American politician who served in the California State Assembly from the 3rd district between 1854 and 1857, serving as Speaker in 1855. Stow Lake in Golden Gate Park in San Francisco is named after him.

Life and Career 

Stow was born in Binghamton, New York in 1824.

He was elected to the California State Assembly as a Whig in 1853 and served until 1857, serving as Speaker of the Assembly in 1855. In 1856, he was a primary candidate for the Know Nothing party for Governor of California but lost. He then served as a confidential attorney for the Southern Pacific Railroad between 1870 and 1893. He was also on the Golden Gate Park board between 1889 and 1893.

Stow died unexpectedly in San Francisco in February 1895. He is buried in Mountain View Cemetery in Oakland.

References 

1824 births
1895 deaths
Speakers of the California State Assembly